Mitchells Corner or Mitchell's Corners may refer to:

Mitchells Corner, Missouri
Mitchell's Corners, Ontario